An election to Hampshire County Council took place on 5 May 2005 as part of the 2005 United Kingdom local elections. 78 councillors were elected from 75 electoral divisions, which returned either one or two county councillors each by first-past-the-post voting for a four-year term of office. The electoral divisions were changed from the previous election, but continued to be used for 2009. Elections in Portsmouth and Southampton did not coincide with this election, as they are unitary authorities, and therefore outside the area covered by the County Council.

Summary 
The election saw the Conservatives remain in control, with 46 seats, giving a majority of six. The Liberal Democrats were the next biggest party, with 28 seats, followed by the Labour Party with four seats.

Results 
The table below only tallies the votes of the highest polling candidate for each party within each ward. This is known as the top candidate method and is often used for multi-member plurality elections. Candidates standing as "Liberal Democrat Local Resident" or "Labour Local Resident" banners are counted under the Liberal Democrats and Labour Parties respectively, and those standing as unaffiliated are counted as Independent.

|}

Results by District

Basingstoke and Deane

Eastleigh

East Hampshire

Fareham

Gosport

Hart

Havant

New Forest

Rushmoor

Test Valley

Winchester

References

Hampshire County Council elections
2005 English local elections
2000s in Hampshire